The Empire of Japan competed at the Summer Olympic Games for the first time at the 1912 Summer Olympics in Stockholm, Sweden.

Background
When Pierre de Coubertin formulated the modern Olympic Games, it was his intent for the games to be global in scale. However, no athletes from any Asian nation participated in the first four games, which was a cause for great concern. Kristian Hellström of the Swedish Olympic Committee wrote to the government of Japan to ask if they were going to send teams to the 1912 Olympics. The Japanese government did not want to embarrass itself on an international stage by saying no, so the Ministry of Education was told to look into this. The Ministry turned to Kanō Jigorō, the founder of modern judo, with recent experience in Europe. Kanō, after talking to the French ambassador to Japan and reading pamphlets sent by the Swedes, developed, in his words, "a fairly good idea of what the Olympic Games were" and agreed to become a member of the International Olympic Committee.

However, the Ministry of Education was uncooperative in providing any funding for participation in the Olympics, so Kanō approached the Japan Physical Education Society (Nippon Taiiku Kai) instead. However, the necessary funding was still not forthcoming, so in 1912, Kanō helped establish the Japan Amateur Athletic Association (Dai Nippon Tai-iku Kyokai), of which he became president

Athletics

Two athletes represented Japan in that nation's Olympic debut. Mishima advanced to the semifinals in one of his three events, but did not start the semifinal race. Kanakuri abandoned the marathon due to the heat; because he never notified race officials before returning to Japan, Swedish authorities considered him missing for 50 years before discovering that he was living in Japan oblivious to his status in Sweden. Finally notified, Kanakuri finished the marathon more than 54 years after he started, with an unofficial score measured to the same tenths of a second standard as used for other runners at the 1912 marathon (54 y, 8 m, 6 d, 8:32:20.3).

Ranks given are within that athlete's heat for running events.

Notes

References
Guttmann, Allen. Japanese Sports: A History. University of Hawaii Press (2001),

External links
Official Olympic Reports

Nations at the 1912 Summer Olympics
1912
Olympics